The 1929 World Fencing Championships were held in Naples, Italy.

Medal summary

Men's events

Women's events

References

World Fencing Championships
International fencing competitions hosted by Italy
World Fencing Championships
Sports competitions in Naples
20th century in Naples